"Shoot Straight from Your Heart" is a song written and recorded by American country music artist Vince Gill.  It was released in January 2001 as the third single from the album Let's Make Sure We Kiss Goodbye.  The song reached #31 on the Billboard Hot Country Singles & Tracks chart.

Chart performance

References

2001 singles
2000 songs
Vince Gill songs
Songs written by Vince Gill
Song recordings produced by Tony Brown (record producer)
MCA Nashville Records singles